Daral James Pugh (born 5 June 1961) is a Welsh former professional footballer who played as a midfielder. He is currently head of coaching for the Sheffield Wednesday academy.

Playing career
During his playing career, Pugh played for Doncaster Rovers, Huddersfield Town, Rotherham United, Cambridge United, Torquay United and Bridlington Town.

Coaching career
After retiring,Pugh replaced Jack Detchon (who crossed the pond to Kenyon College in the USA )as Wakefield District Council Football Development officer accompanied by Paul Gater and Shaun Selby within the Sports  development team headed up by Chris Froggett, after leaving this position,  Pugh then became under-18s coach at Leeds United, before becoming assistant academy manager after being replaced as under-18s manager by Neil Redfearn. However, due to restructuring at the club's academy, he, along with then academy manager Neil Thompson, was released in late October 2010.

On 1 July 2011, he was named head of youth at Bury.

In October 2013, Pugh was appointed head of academy coaching at Hull City.

On 5 August 2015, Pugh returned to Leeds United as the head of academy coaching, effectively replacing Redfearn. Also joining him from Hull City was coach John Anderson, who became Leeds' under-18s manager.

On 24 February 2017, Pugh was appointed as interim lead professional development phase coach at Rotherham United until the end of the season.

References

1961 births
Living people
Welsh footballers
Footballers from Swansea
Association football midfielders
English Football League players
Doncaster Rovers F.C. players
Huddersfield Town A.F.C. players
Rotherham United F.C. players
Cambridge United F.C. players
Torquay United F.C. players